RB Leipzig are a German women's football club based in Leipzig that competes in the 2. Frauen-Bundesliga, the second tier of women's football in Germany. Since its inception in 2016, the club has been affiliated with RB Leipzig, a men's team in the Bundesliga.

History

Establishment
RB Leipzig entered women's football in 2016. The club initially planned to partner  with Leipziger FC 07, forming a joint team in the fourth tier Landesliga Sachsen. The partnership was meant to last for one year, after which RB Leipzig was to continue as an independent, and reserved the right to advance. RB Leipzig and Leipziger FC 07 were given a playing right for the 2016–17 Landesliga Sachsen on a wild card by the Saxony Football Association (SFV). A few weeks before the start of the season, the partnership ended and RB Leipzig announced that it was to compete as an independent.

The first squad gathered 17 players from FFV Leipzig, five talents from the RB Leipzig women's junior teams and one from the reserve team of FF USV Jena. The team was trained by Sebastian Popp, former head coach of women's football team SV Eintracht Leipzig-Süd. The SFV expected the RB Leipzig women's team, with the state training centre for women's and girls' football, to advance from Landesliga Sachsen to Bundesliga within 3 to 5 years.

The team played its first competitive match on 7 August 2016 in the first round of the 2016–17 Saxony Cup away against SV Johannstadt 90. RB Leipzig recorded a 7–0 victory, and advanced to the next round.

The RB Leipzig women's team joined the 2016–17 Landesliga Sachsen (effectively skipping the 5th tier), generating criticism from several clubs. The criticisms were heard, and after a roundtable discussion with other clubs and the SFV, Leipzig offered to play the season starting seven youth players each game. The SFV also ordered the first three games to be replayed and disqualified Leipzig from the Saxony Cup. RB Leipzig won the league with four matchdays remaining.

After finishing 4th and 3rd in their first two seasons in the third tier, Leipzig won the Regionalliga Nordost and achieved promotion to the second division after the 2019–20 season's completion was cancelled due to the COVID-19 pandemic in Germany.

Stadium
The team play home matches at the Sportanlage Gontardweg, which is the location of the state training centre for women's and girls football of the SFV, taken over by RB Leipzig from FFV Leipzig in July 2016.

Players

First Team Squad

Seasons

Notes

Key

Key to league:
 P = Played
 W = Games won
 D = Games drawn
 L = Games lost
 GF = Goals for
 GA = Goals against
 Pts = Points
 Pos = Final position

Key to divisions and rounds:
 W = Champions
 RU = Final (Runners-up)
 SF = Semi-finals
 QF = Quarter-finals
 R32/R16 = Round of 32, Round of 16, etc.
1R/2R = 1st Round, 2nd Round, etc.

Honours

League
 Regionalliga Nordost (III)
 Champions: 2019-20
 Landesliga Sachsen (IV)
 Champions: 2016-17

Cup
 Saxony Cup (de) 
 Champions: 2018-19, 2019–20

References 

Women
Women's football clubs in Germany
Football clubs in Saxony
Association football clubs established in 2016
2016 establishments in Germany